Cyperus glomeratus is a species of sedge that is native to parts of Europe, the Middle East and Asia. It grows in rice fields and shores of rivers.

See also 
 List of Cyperus species

References 

glomeratus
Plants described in 1756
Flora of Austria
Flora of France
Flora of China
Flora of Bulgaria
Flora of the Czech Republic
Flora of Greece
Flora of Russia
Flora of Hungary
Flora of Italy
Flora of Mongolia
Flora of Japan
Flora of Iran
Flora of Kazakhstan
Flora of Korea
Flora of Romania
Flora of Spain
Flora of Switzerland
Flora of Turkmenistan
Flora of Turkey
Flora of Ukraine
Flora of Uzbekistan
Taxa named by Carl Linnaeus